
Year 1536 (MDXXXVI) was a leap year starting on Saturday (link will display the full calendar) of the Julian calendar.

Events 

 January–June 
 January – King Henry VIII of England suffers a leg injury during a jousting tournament.
January 6 – The Colegio de Santa Cruz de Tlatelolco, the oldest European school of higher learning in the Americas, is established by Franciscans in Mexico City.
 January 22 – John of Leiden, Bernhard Knipperdolling and Bernhard Krechting are executed in Münster for their roles in the Münster Rebellion.
 February 2 – Spaniard Pedro de Mendoza founds Buenos Aires, Argentina.
 February 18 – A Franco-Ottoman alliance exempts French merchants from Ottoman law and allows them to travel, buy and sell throughout the sultan's dominions, and to pay low customs duties on French imports and exports. The compact is confirmed in 1569.
 February 25 – Tyrolean Anabaptist leader Jacob Hutter, founder of the Hutterites, is burned at the stake in Innsbruck for heresy.
 March 
 The first edition of John Calvin's Institutes of the Christian Religion, a seminal work of Protestant systematic theology, is published in Basel.
 The Italian War of 1536–1538 resumes between Francis I of France and Charles V, Holy Roman Emperor. Francis seizes control of Savoy, and captures Turin. Charles triumphally enters Rome, following the Via Triumphalis, and delivers a speech before the Pope and College of Cardinals, publicly challenging the king of France to a duel.
 April – An Acte for Laws & Justice to be ministred in Wales in like fourme as it is in this Realme further incorporates the legal system of Wales into that of England.
 April 6 – Count's Feud: Malmø surrenders to King Christian III of Denmark.
 April 14 – The Reformation Parliament in England passes an Act for the Dissolution of the Monasteries. Religious houses closed as part of Henry VIII's dissolution include: Basingwerk Abbey, Bourne Abbey, Brinkburn Priory, Buildwas Abbey, Cartmel Priory, Dorchester Abbey, Dore Abbey, Haltemprice Priory, Keldholme Priory and Tintern Abbey.
 April 30 – The Inquisition is implemented in Portugal.
 May 2 – Anne Boleyn, second queen of Henry VIII of England, is arrested on the grounds of incest, adultery and treason.
 May 6 – Incan emperor Manco Inca Yupanqui, having on April 18 escaped from imprisonment in Cuzco, begins his revolt against his captors, when his army begins the 10-month Siege of Cuzco against a garrison of Spanish conquistadors and Indian auxiliaries, led by Hernando Pizarro.
 May 14 – Thomas Cranmer declares Henry VIII of England's marriage to Anne Boleyn to be null and void.
 May 19 – Anne Boleyn is beheaded.
 May 30 – Henry VIII of England marries Jane Seymour.
 June 24 – San Juan Bautista del Teul is founded by Cristóbal de Oñate in New Spain.
 June 26 – Spanish navigator Andrés de Urdaneta and a few companions arrive in Lisbon from the Maluku Islands, completing a westward circumnavigation which began with the Loaísa expedition of 1525.
 June 27 – San Pedro Sula is founded by Pedro de Alvarado in Honduras.

 July–December 
 July 29 – Count's Feud ends when Copenhagen surrenders to King Christian III of Denmark. On August 6 he marches into the city and on August 12 arrests the country's bishops, thus consolidating the Protestant Reformation in Denmark.
 August 5 – Guelders Wars: Battle of Heiligerlee – Danish allies of Charles II, Duke of Guelders, under command of Meindert van Ham, are defeated by Habsburg forces under Georg Schenck van Toutenburg in the Low Countries.
 August 10 – Francis III, Duke of Brittany, Dauphin of France, dies having caught a chill after a game of tennis which had developed into a fever; under torture Sebastiano de Montecuccoli, his Italian secretary, confesses to poisoning him and is brutally executed on October 7. Francis' younger brother, Henry, Duke of Orléans, succeeds as heir to the kingdom.
 October 1–December 5 – The Pilgrimage of Grace, a rebellion in England against Henry VIII's church reforms, beginning as the Lincolnshire Rising and spreading to Yorkshire, from where it is led by Robert Aske.
 October 6 – English Bible translator William Tyndale is burned at the stake in Vilvoorde, Flanders.

 Date unknown 
 Battle of Reynogüelén: Spanish conquistadors defeat a group of Mapuches in Chile, during the expedition of Diego de Almagro. 
 Battle of Un no Kuchi: Takeda Family forces defeat Hiraga Genshin.

Births 

 January 22 – Philibert, Margrave of Baden-Baden (d. 1569)
 February 2 
 Scévole de Sainte-Marthe, French poet (d. 1623)
 Piotr Skarga, Polish writer (d. 1612)
 February 12 – Leonardo Donato, Doge of Venice (d. 1612)
 February 24 – Pope Clement VIII (d. 1605)
 March 6 – Santi di Tito, Italian painter (d. 1603)
 March 10 – Thomas Howard, 4th Duke of Norfolk, English politician (d. 1572)
 March 31 – Ashikaga Yoshiteru, Japanese shōgun (d. 1565)
 April 8 – Barbara of Hesse (d. 1597)
 May 3 – Stephan Praetorius, German theologian (d. 1603)
 May 13 – Jacobus Pamelius, Belgian bishop (d. 1587)
 August 10 – Caspar Olevian, German Protestant theologian (d. 1587)
 August 14 – René, Marquis of Elbeuf (d. 1566)
 October 18 – William Lambarde, English antiquarian, writer on legal subjects, politician (d. 1601)
 October 21 – Joachim Ernest, Prince of Anhalt (d. 1586)
 October 28 – Felix Plater, Swiss physician (d. 1614)
 November 11 – Marcantonio Memmo, Doge of Venice (d. 1615)
 November 22 – Johann VI, Count of Nassau-Dillenburg (d. 1606)
 December 26 – Yi I, Korean Confucian scholar (d. 1584)
 December 29 – Henry VI, Burgrave of Plauen (d. 1572)
 date unknown
 Juan de Fuca, Greek maritime pilot (d. 1602)
 Jeong Cheol, Korean administrator and poet (d. 1593)
 Thomas Sackville, 1st Earl of Dorset, English statesman and poet (d. 1608)
 Leonor de Cisneros, Spanish Protestant (d. 1568)
 Lord Guildford Dudley, English nobleman (executed 1554)
 Roger Marbeck, chief physician to Elizabeth I of England (d. 1604)
 Charles Howard, 1st Earl of Nottingham, English statesman and admiral (d. 1624)
 Friedrich Sylburg, German classical scholar (d. 1596)
 Ikeda Tsuneoki, Japanese military commander (d. 1584)

Deaths 

 January 6 – Baldassare Peruzzi, Italian architect and painter (b. 1481)
 January 7 – Catherine of Aragon, First Queen of Henry VIII of England (b. 1485)
 January 22
 John of Leiden, Anabaptist leader from the Dutch city of Leiden (b. 1509)
 Bernhard Knipperdolling, German religious leader (b. c. 1495)
 February 25
 Berchtold Haller, German-born reformer (b. 1492)
 Jacob Hutter, Tyrolean founder of the Hutterite religious movement (burned at the stake)
 March 1 – Bernardo Accolti, Italian poet (b. 1465)
 March 15 – Pargalı Ibrahim Pasha, Ottoman grand vizier (b. 1493)
 April 4 – Frederick I, Margrave of Brandenburg-Ansbach (b. 1460)
 May 17 – George Boleyn, 2nd Viscount Rochford, English diplomat (executed, with four other men accused of adultery with the queen) (b. 1503) 
 May 19 – Anne Boleyn, second queen of Henry VIII of England (executed) (b. c. 1501/1507)
 May 31 – Charles I, Duke of Münsterberg-Oels, Count of Kladsko, Governor of Bohemia and Silesia (b. 1476)
 June 29 – Bernhard III, Margrave of Baden-Baden (b. 1474)
 July 12 – Erasmus, Dutch philosopher (b. 1466)
 July 23 – Henry FitzRoy, 1st Duke of Richmond and Somerset, illegitimate son of Henry VIII of England (b. 1519)
 June 28 – Richard Pace, English diplomat (b. 1482)
 August 10 – Francis III, Duke of Brittany, Dauphin of France, brother of Henry II (b. 1518)
 September 25 – Johannes Secundus, Dutch poet (b. 1511)
 September 26 – Didier de Saint-Jaille, 46th Grandmaster of the Knights Hospitaller
 September 27 – Felice della Rovere, also known as Madonna Felice, was the illegitimate daughter of Pope Julius II (b. 1483)
 October 6 – William Tyndale, English Protestant Bible translator (b. c. 1494)
 October 14 – Garcilaso de la Vega, Spanish poet (b. 1503)
 December 21 – Sir John Seymour, English courtier (b. 1474)
 date unknown
 Hector Boece, Scottish philosopher (b. 1465)
 Cecilia Gallerani, principal mistress of Ludovico Sforza, Duke of Milan (b. 1473)
 Hiraga Genshin, Japanese retainer and samurai
 John Rastell, English printer and author
 Jacques Lefèvre d'Étaples, French theologian and humanist (b. c. 1450)

References